Three ships of the French Navy have borne the name Corcyre, the French name for Corfu:

 Corcyre (1797), previously the British privateer Cornish Hero
 Corcyre (1798), was a djerme or cange, a narrow boat with sails that operated on the Nile. The French used her during the French campaign in Egypt and Syria.
 Corcyre (1809), previously the Russian frigate Liogkii

References
 
 

French Navy ship names